Salt Rush with Mark Peters is a debut collaborative album by composer Matthew Linley, vocalist Maud Waret and guitarist Mark Peters of Engineers. It is the first release by the collective and was released on Pedigree Cuts (part of Warner/Chappell Production Music) on 24 June 2016 as a digital download.

Track listing

Personnel

Musicians
 Maud Waret - vocals
 Matthew Linley - synths, drums, programming
 Mark Peters - guitars, programming
 Roger Linley - bass on tracks 8 and 9

Producers
 Written and produced by Matthew Linley
 Mixed and produced by Mark Peters

References

External links
Salt Rush with Mark Peters Discogs page
Salt Rush Soundcloud page

2016 debut albums
Electronic albums by English artists